The Rees Gabriel House is a historic building located in Des Moines, Iowa, United States.  Gabriel was a dealer in building supplies.  The basic designs for this house were drawn by C.E. Eastman and Co. and modified by Gabriel himself.  The primary modifications include an extension of the turret to include an observation room in the attic, and several changes to the shape of the windows.  The house is considered a good and well preserved example of the Queen Anne style.  The 2½-story frame structure features an irregular plan, a hipped roof with intersecting gables and dormers, a round corner tower with a bell-shaped roof, and several porches.  The house was listed on the National Register of Historic Places in 1978.

References 

Houses completed in 1896
Queen Anne architecture in Iowa
Houses in Des Moines, Iowa
National Register of Historic Places in Des Moines, Iowa
Houses on the National Register of Historic Places in Iowa